Couepia polyandra, also known as olosapo, zapote amarillo, baboon cap, and monkey cap, is a flowering tree in the family Chrysobalanaceae.

Distribution
Couepia polyandra is native to southern Mexico south to Panama and has been introduced to Florida.

Description
They are round to cuneate at the base and acuminate at the apex. The acumen measures 2-10 millimeters in length. They are glabrous above when mature and have a caducous pubescence when young. The underside is strongly arachnoid. The midrib is prominent above and is pubescent when young; primary veins are in pairs of 8-15 and are prominent on both surfaces. The stipules of the leaves measure 2-4 millimeters in length and are linear, membranous, and caducous. The petioles measure 4-7 millimeters in length and are terete with 2 inconspicuous medial glands. The inflorescences are terminal and axillary panicles. The rachis and branches have a short, light brown pubescence and the bracts and bracteoles measure 1–3.5 millimeters in length and are ovate and caducous. The receptacle is subcylindrical and measures around 4 millimeters in length and has a short, appressed pubescence on the exterior and is glabrous within except for the deflexed hairs at the throat. The calyx lobes are rounded and the petals number 5 and are white and glabrous but have ciliate margins. It has 11-21 stamens, which are inserted in an arc of 180-240 degrees with a few staminodes opposite. The ovary is villous and pubescent for half its length. The bark is brown in color and mostly smooth. The fruit is edible and is yellow to orange-yellow in color when ripe and is green when unripe. It contains one large seed. The epicarp is glabrous, smooth, and thin. The mesocarp is thick and fleshy. The endocarp is thin, fragile, fibrous, and glabrous within. The flesh is fibrous, semi-dry, and egg yolk-like in consistency. It has a mild, sweet flavor similar to canistel when ripe but has a very astringent flavor when unripe. The plant requires a sunny position to grow and is fairly drought-resistant. Trees begin fruiting at about 6 years of age.

Uses
The fruit is gathered from the wild and eaten and it is occasionally cultivated for its fruit.

Chemistry
A new triterpene was isolated from Couepia polyandra: 3beta,16beta,23-triacetoxyolean-12-en-28-oic acid, as well as four known compounds, oleanolic acid, betulinic acid, stigmasterol, and beta-sitosterol. All five compounds inhibited DNA polymerase beta lyase activity.

Pests
The trees are largely disease-free but may be attacked by seed weevils.

See also
List of culinary fruits

References

Flora of Mexico
Flora of Central America
Fruit trees
Edible fruits
Plants described in 1899
Taxa named by Joseph Nelson Rose
Drought-tolerant trees
Chrysobalanaceae
Cloud forest flora of Mexico